Morne Longue is a town in Saint Andrew Parish, Grenada.  It is located at the center of the island.

References 

Populated places in Grenada